Paul Simon is the second solo studio album by American singer-songwriter Paul Simon. It was released in January 1972, nearly two years after he split up with longtime musical partner Art Garfunkel. His first solo album was recorded in England in 1965 but remained unreleased in the U.S. (except for a brief period in 1969) until 1981, when it appeared in the 5-LP Collected Works boxed set. Originally released on Columbia Records, Paul Simon was then issued under the Warner Bros. label and is now back with Columbia through Sony. The album topped the charts in the United Kingdom, Japan and Norway and reached No. 4 on the U.S. Billboard Pop Albums. In 1986 it was certified platinum.

History
Simon taught songwriting classes at New York University during the summer of 1971. Among the students he taught were two of the Roche sisters, Maggie and Terre, and singer-songwriter Melissa Manchester who remembers that Simon was nervous, listened to the students' songs and offered suggestions and criticism, often dissecting the lyrics and drawing comparisons with his own work while offering insights into his own work and sources of inspiration.

Simon traveled to San Francisco to record some demos and began to work with different musical styles for a proposed solo album, including Latin music, jazz, blues, and reggae with the song "Mother and Child Reunion", which was recorded in Kingston, Jamaica. Guest musicians on the record included Stéphane Grappelli, Ron Carter, and Airto Moreira.

Several songs on the album, such as "Run That Body Down" (in which both "Paul" and "Peg" are mentioned by name) and "Congratulations", make reference directly or indirectly to his rocky marriage to Peggy (née Harper), which ended in divorce in 1975. Other themes include drugs and adolescence.

Reception

Reviewing for The Village Voice in 1972, Robert Christgau said, "this is the only thing in the universe to make me positively happy in the first two weeks of February 1972." In Rolling Stone that year, Jon Landau called it Simon's "least detached, most personal and painful piece of work thus far — this from a lyricist who has never shied away from pain as subject or theme."

Critical praise was indeed widespread for this album, though some reviewers were put off by it.  Noel Coppage, in Stereo Review, called it "undistinguished" and added, "I gather...this album is merely Simon's way of keeping his hand in while Garfunkel makes movies....I'm now wondering if Garfunkel's arranging work doesn't include sending Simon back to rewrite some of his songs before recording them."  Despite Coppage's panning, the other Stereo Review critics went on to give the album one of its "Record Of The Year" awards. It was ranked number 268 on Rolling Stones 2012 list of the 500 Greatest Albums of All Time, and was ranked number 425 in the 2020 update.  It was ranked number 984 in All-Time Top 1000 Albums (3rd. edition, 2000).

Track listing
All songs written by Paul Simon, except "Hobo's Blues" co-written by Stéphane Grappelli.

Personnel 
Track numbering refers to CD and digital releases of this album.

 Paul Simon – vocals, acoustic guitar, percussion (10)
 Neville Hinds – organ (1)
 Larry Knechtel – acoustic piano (1, 11), Wurlitzer electric piano (3, 11), harmonium (3, 8), organ (11)
 Hux Brown – lead guitar (1)
 Wallace Wilson – rhythm guitar (1)
 Los Incas – charango (2), percussion (2), flute (2)
 Jerry Hahn – electric guitar (4, 5)
 David Spinozza – acoustic guitar (4, 6)
 Stefan Grossman – bottleneck guitar (10)
 Jackie Jackson – bass guitar (1)
 Ron Carter – double bass (4)
 Russell George – bass guitar (6)
 Joe Osborn – bass guitar (7, 11)
 Winston Grennan – drums (1)
 Hal Blaine – drums (4, 10, 11)
 Denzil Laing – percussion (1)
 Mike Mainieri – vibraphone (4)
 Airto Moreira – percussion (5, 6)
 Victor Montanez – congas (7)
 Fred Lipsius – alto saxophone (5)
 John Schroer – tenor saxophone (5), baritone saxophone (10)
 Steve Turre – trombone (10)
 Charlie McCoy – bass harmonica (8)
 Stéphane Grappelli – violin (9)
 Cissy Houston – backing vocals (1)
 Von Eva Sims – backing vocals (1)
 Renelle Stafford – backing vocals (1)
 Deirdre Tuck – backing vocals (1)

Production 
 Paul Simon – producer, arrangements
 Roy Halee – co-producer, engineer (1-5, 7-10)
 Phil Ramone – engineer (6)
 Bernard Estardy – additional engineer (2)
 George Horn – mastering at CBS Studios (San Francisco, California)
 Leslie Kong – music contractor (1)
 John Berg – design 
 Ron Coro – design
 P.A. Harper – photography

Charts

Weekly charts

Year-end charts

Certifications

See also
Biography Paul Simon and Garfunkel
Allmusic entry

References

Paul Simon albums
1972 albums
Albums produced by Roy Halee
Columbia Records albums
Warner Records albums
Albums produced by Paul Simon
Albums recorded at United Western Recorders